The St. Cloud State Huskies women's ice hockey represented St. Cloud State University. The club competed in the WCHA and attempted to reach the NCAA Frozen Four. However, the team only won one game all year.

Exhibition

Regular season

Season standings

Awards and honors
Molli Mott, WCHA Rookie of the Week (Week of February 16, 2011)
Ashley Nixon, WCHA Defensive Player of the Week (Week of December 7, 2010)

See also
2009–10 St. Cloud State Huskies women's ice hockey season

References

S
S
St. Cloud State Huskies women's ice hockey seasons
2010 in sports in Minnesota
2011 in sports in Minnesota